Sun Sheng may refer to:

Sun Sheng (Jin dynasty) (孫盛) (302–373), historian of imperial China's Jin Dynasty
Sun Sheng (Southern Tang) (孫晟) (died 956), chancellor of imperial China's Southern Tang Dynasty

See also
 Sun Sheng Xi (born 1990), Taiwanese-Korean singer-songwriter